Alexandre is a French and Portuguese surname. Alexandre means warrior or defending men.  Notable people with the surname include:

Aaron Alexandre (c.1765–1850), German-born French-English chess player and writer
Caio Alexandre (born 1999), Brazilian footballer
Guy Alexandre (1945–2014), Haitian diplomat
Jean Alexandre (footballer) (born 1986), Haitian footballer
Jean C-Alexandre (born 1942), Haitian doctor and diplomat
Kathryn Alexandre (born 1990), Canadian actress
Laurent Alexandre (born 1972), French politician
Marcelo Alexandre (born 1963), Argentine cyclist
Matheus Alexandre (born 1999), Brazilian footballer
Maxime Alexandre (born 1971), Belgian-Italian cinematographer
Rodolphe Alexandre (born 1953), French politician 

French-language surnames
Portuguese-language surnames